Missouri University of Science and Technology (Missouri S&T or S&T) is a public research university in Rolla, Missouri.  It is a member institution of the University of Missouri System. Most of its 7,083 students (2022) study engineering, business, sciences, and mathematics. Known primarily for its engineering school, Missouri S&T offers degree programs in business and management systems, information science and technology, sciences, social sciences, humanities, and arts. Its Carnegie classification is as a "STEM-dominant", R2 doctoral university with "high research activity".

History

Missouri S&T was founded in 1870 as the Missouri School of Mines and Metallurgy (MSM), the first technological learning institution west of the Mississippi River. Early in its history, the School of Mines was focused primarily on mining and metallurgy. Rolla is located close to the Southeast Missouri Lead District which produces about 70% of the U.S. primary supply of lead as well as significant amounts of the nation's zinc.

The school was founded under the auspices of the University of Missouri in Columbia in order to take advantage of the Morrill Land-Grant Acts to "teach such branches of learning as are related to agriculture and the mechanic arts, in such manner as the legislatures of the States may respectively prescribe, in order to promote the liberal and practical education of the industrial classes in the several pursuits and professions in life." The endowment said that the land could not be sold for less than $1.25/acre and as such was a minimum endowment of $412,500 for Missouri. There was an intense debate in the state over the location and number of schools before it was finally decided to have one school in Columbia and a branch in the mining area of southeast Missouri.

Iron County, Missouri (Ironton) and Phelps County, Missouri (Rolla) made bids for the school. Iron County's bid was valued at $112,545 and Phelps County's bid was $130,545 so the Phelps bid was officially approved on December 20, 1870.

Classes began on November 23, 1871, in a new building that the city of Rolla had just built. The college had an enrollment of 28 and three graduates in 1874. The college bought what is now called the "Rolla Building" for $25,000 in January 1875. That building is now used as the Mathematics and Statistics Department's library, chair's office, part of the main office, and other faculty offices following a $2 million renovation in 1995.

Initially, the school only offered degrees in civil engineering, metallurgy, and mining engineering. However, by the late 1920s, the school had added degrees in ceramic engineering, chemical engineering, electrical engineering, and mechanical engineering. The school became home to Missouri's first operational nuclear reactor in 1961.

In June 2018, the school was approved by the state's Coordinating Board for Higher Education for designation as "highly selective" in its undergraduate admission criteria, joining only Truman State University among the state's public universities at that level. As such, first-time, full-time students seeking degrees are generally only admitted if they have a "percentile score" of 140 points or greater, a combination of their high school class and college testing (ACT or SAT) percentile ranks. Missouri Department of Higher Education guidelines state that schools in this category may admit up to ten percent of students with lower percentile scores, and will automatically admit those with an ACT (or equivalent SAT) score of 27 or better.

Changes in hierarchy and name
Until 1964, the school was considered an offsite department of MU's School of Agriculture and Mechanical Arts, reporting to the main campus in Columbia (although it began fielding sports teams in 1935 in the Mid-America Intercollegiate Athletics Association). As such, its presiding officer was originally called a director (1871–1941), then a dean (1941–1964). In 1963 the University of Missouri System was created with the additions of standalone campuses in Kansas City and St. Louis. A year later, MSM was upgraded to an autonomous standalone campus as the University of Missouri at Rolla and its presiding officer, like that of its sister schools, was granted the title of chancellor. The curriculum was expanded to include most of the science and engineering disciplines, as well as social sciences and liberal arts such as psychology and history. In 1968, the campus name was slightly altered to the University of Missouri–Rolla, thus conforming to the naming scheme of the other three campuses. Business and management programs were gradually added in the following years. On January 1, 2008, UMR became known as Missouri University of Science and Technology or Missouri S&T for short.

In making the case for changing the name, then Chancellor John F. Carney III noted that Rolla in 2007 was "one of the few technological research universities in the nation. A technological research university (polytechnic university or institute of technology) may be defined as one in which a majority of students are enrolled in engineering, the sciences, business or mathematics; the graduate and research programs in those fields are robust; and exceptional academic programs in the liberal arts, humanities and social sciences complement and provide context to the technological strengths of the institution."

He noted that more than 70 percent of its enrollment was in engineering and more than 90 percent was in engineering, business, science and math—significantly higher than engineering schools such as the Massachusetts Institute of Technology, Georgia Institute of Technology, and Rensselaer Polytechnic Institute. He noted "The university's name, however, does not reflect the distinctive nature of the campus. Often, UMR is viewed as a 'satellite' or 'branch' campus due to its name or as a 'feeder' campus for the University of Missouri-Columbia (commonly referred to as the University of Missouri). This branch-campus designation hinders many of our efforts to achieve national recognition and a strong reputation as a technological research university."

He noted, "Of the 1.1 million seniors in the nation who took the ACT in 2006, only 551 non-Missouri seniors – or .05 percent – sent their scores to UMR." He also noted that the school's acronym of UMR got it confused with the University of Minnesota Rochester.

Among the other names that were considered were Missouri University of Science and Engineering, Missouri Technological University, and Missouri Science and Engineering University.

Chancellors
The naming structure for the head of the university has changed reflecting its changes through the years. The head currently reports to the University of Missouri System.

The chancellor lives on campus at the Chancellor Residence (constructed in 1889 as the "Club House" dormitory, converted to a room house, before becoming the Missouri State Geological Survey headquarters and finally becoming the residence for the then-director in 1905).

In August 2018, a committee was announced to lead a nationwide search for the next chancellor, the office having been filled on an interim basis since May 2017. In May 2019, Mohammad Dehghani of Stevens Institute of Technology was announced as the next Missouri S&T chancellor, to begin service in August 2019. Dehghani had previously held leadership positions at the Lawrence Livermore National Laboratory, the Applied Physics Laboratory, and the Johns Hopkins University Systems Institute, at which he was a founding director.

 Charles Penrose Williams, Director, 1871–77
 Charles Edmund Wait, Director, 1877–88
 William Holding Echols, Director, 1888–91
 Elmo Golightly Harris, Director, 1891–93
 Walter Buck Richards, Director, 1893–97
 George E. Ladd, Director, 1897–07
 Lewis Emmanuel Young, Director, 1907–13
 Leon Ellis Garrett, Acting Director, 1913–15
 Durward Copeland, Director, 1915
 Austin Lee McRae, Director, 1915–20
 Charles Herman Fulton, Director, 1920–37
 William Reuel Chedsey, Director, 1937–41
 Curtis L. Wilson, Dean, 1941–63
 Merl Baker, Dean 1963–1964, Chancellor 1964–73Dudley Thompson, Acting Chancellor, 1973–74
 Raymond L. Bisplinghoff, Chancellor, 1974–76Jim C. Pogue, Interim Chancellor, 1977–78
 Joseph M. Marchello, Chancellor, 1978–85John T. Park, Interim Chancellor, 1985–86
 Martin C. Jischke, Chancellor, 1986–91
 John T. Park, Chancellor (initially interim), 1991–2000
 Gary Thomas, Chancellor, 2000–05
 John F. Carney III, Chancellor, 2005 – August 2011Warren K. Wray, Interim Chancellor, September 2011 – March 2012
 Cheryl B. Schrader, Chancellor, April 2012 – May 2017Christopher G. Maples, Interim Chancellor, May 2017 – July 2019
 Mohammad Dehghani, Chancellor, August 2019 – present

Historic $300 million gift
In October 2020, the university received the largest single gift to any university, public or private, in the state of Missouri. The $300 million gift from June and Fred Kummer established a new foundation to establish the Kummer Institute for Student Success, Research and Economic Development. The gift also will establish a new college of innovation and entrepreneurship at Missouri S&T, develop new areas for research, provide scholarships and fellowships for students, and bolster the Rolla region's economy.

Military service 
Military service has long been a tradition at the college. Beginning with the American Civil War, students and faculty have served in all major American conflicts.

Civil War 
Three individuals: James Abert, George D. Emerson, and Robert W. Douthat served in the American Civil War and as faculty.

World War One 
When the United States entered WWI in April, 1917, a total of 65 members of the university, students and faculty, entered into the service for First Officers Training Camp. Almost half of the enrolled student population was involved in The Great War in some capacity, as the total enrollment was 186, down from 301 students. In total, nine men from the university sacrificed their lives. Two men received the Distinguished Service Cross from General John J. Pershing. One man, H. F. Allison, is credited with the first shot fired in France from a member of the American Expeditionary Force.

Inter-war years 
In 1920, the college started its Reserve Officer Training Corps. An integral part of university life, at least half of all students made ROTC a part of their curriculum from 1924 to 1940. Of the 931 students enrolled in 1940, 534 were also ROTC Cadets. Two cadets from these inter-war years eventually made the rank of general: Byron E. Peebles and Walter P. Leber, from the classes of 1936 and 1940, respectively.

WWII 
After the bombing of Pearl Harbor, MSM faced the repeated challenge of students seeking to immediately enlist to help the war effort as had occurred in 1917. The 1941–42 administration, including Curtis Laws Wilson, instead encouraged the student body to finish their training as that would make them more useful to the military.

Campus

Bertelsmeyer Hall 
Bertlsmeyer Hall is located at the intersection of 11th street and State Street. The construction of Bertelsmeyer Hall broke ground in April 2013. It was named after James E. Bertelsmeyer (BS ChemE 1966), who contributed $5 million towards its construction. The building was dedicated in October 2014 and is the current home of the Chemical and Biochemical Engineering Department.

Castleman Hall 
Castleman Hall, completed in March 1991, was dedicated in October 1991 as a new  home for the alumni and development offices, and the music and theater departments. Featuring a 660-seat performing arts center, the building occupies the city block between Main and State Streets, and Tenth and Eleventh Streets. The alumni and music offices had been in Harris Hall since the 1970s. The Alumni Association moved to the Hasselmann building in 2015.

Curtis Laws Wilson Library 

The Curtis Laws Wilson Library is the main academic library on campus. Wilson served as dean of the school from 1941 to 1963.  The library's third floor is strictly a quiet study area with multiple rooms circling around the main area. The IT Helpdesk Walk-In Center is located on the first floor. The Miner Break Cafe (currently a Starbucks) is also located in the front right corner of the first floor.

The basement of the library is a quiet study area and is also home to several campus organizations, including:
 Video Communications Center, which provides video services to the university and produces distance education courses.
 KMST, a radio station licensed in Rolla, Missouri; in 2017, operations moved to the University of Missouri–St. Louis
 State Historical Society of Missouri, Research Center-Rolla, which provides access to records and papers relating to area individuals, families, and organizations
 University Archives, which houses the historical, legal and cultural records of the university

Harris Hall 
Harris Hall opened in 1940 after Director William Chedsey was able to secure $80,000 from the Works Progress Administration and $50,000 in state funding. Harris Hall housed the Civil degree program for nearly two decades. As of April 2021, parts of the building are used by the Army ROTC Stonehenge Battalion, and Air Force ROTC Detachment 442. The building is named after Elmo Golightly Harris, one of the university's first directors, and the first chair of the department of civil engineering. Harris also led the first class held in the building.

Hasselmann Alumni House 

The Hasselmann Alumni house was dedicated in 2015 as the home for the Miner Alumni Association and as a venue for campus and community events.  It is named for Karl Hasselmann, a 1925 graduate in mining engineering, who had a prominent career in the oil industry.  The Miner Alumni Association was organized in 1921 and publishes the Missouri S&T Magazine (formerly the MSM Alumnus).  Alumni and other professionals also support the institution through discipline-specific academies which elect members for contributions to their professions and to the campus.  These S&T groups serve an advisory role and include the Academy of Chemical Engineers, the Academy of Civil Engineers, the Academy of Computer Science, the Academy of Electrical and Computer Engineering, the Academy of Engineering Management, the Academy of Mechanical and Aerospace Engineers, the Academy of Miner Athletics, and the Mines and Metallurgy Academy.

Havener Center 

The Havener Center is a multipurpose campus center for student life and activity.  It is named for entrepreneur Gary Havener, a 1962 graduate in mathematics.  It was dedicated in 2005 to house the Student Life offices, the campus bookstore, a food court, a gameroom, meeting space, etc.

Leach Theatre 
Leach Theatre is located in Castleman Hall and has a maximum seating capacity of 650 audience members. The theatre was opened in 1991 and plays host to approximately 100 events each academic year, including campus events and touring performances of groups such as the St. Louis Symphony Orchestra, the Russian National Ballet, Stomp, as well as off-Broadway shows such as Cats, Evita, and 42nd Street.

Millennium Arch 
The university developed a new way to make deep cuts in granite and worked with artist Edwina Sandys who used the method to create the Millennium Arch sculpture. The Arch is a single trilithon with the stylized silhouettes of a man and a woman cut from the two uprights. The figures cut from the uprights stand nearby as freestanding statues. The work, which is located on 10th Street facing Castleman Hall, was developed as a project of the High Pressure Waterjet Laboratory of the Rock Mechanics & Explosive Research Center at Missouri S&T.

There are two similar but smaller megaliths, showing the same silhouette, on each side of the sidewalk entrance to the Rock Mechanics & Explosive Research Center.

Missouri S&T Stonehenge 
Missouri S&T Stonehenge is a partial reconstruction of the original Stonehenge monument located on Salisbury Plain, in southern England. Missouri S&T's version of the ancient structure is located on the northwest corner of campus, and was dedicated on June 20, 1984, during the summer solstice. It features a  diameter ring of 30 stones around a horseshoe of five trilithons through which various sightings of sunrise and sunset can be made. About 160 tons of granite were used to construct the monument. The rock was cut by Missouri S&T's water jet cutter equipment, which used two waterjets cutting at a pressure of 15,000 pounds of force per square inch (103 MPa), slicing across the surface just like a conventional saw. The cutter moved at a speed of about 10 feet per minute (50 mm/s) and cut between one-quarter and one-half inch (6 and 13 mm) on each pass.

After completion, Missouri S&T Stonehenge received an award from the National Society of Professional Engineers for being one of 1985's Ten Outstanding Engineering Achievements.

Nuclear reactor 

The school operates the 200 kW Missouri S&T nuclear reactor on-campus for educational, training, and research purposes. It became the first nuclear reactor to have become operational in Missouri, and first achieved criticality in 1961.

Parker Hall 
The construction of Parker Hall was completed in 1912. The building housed the campus library until the opening of the Curtis Laws Wilson Library. Parker Hall is one of three buildings (The Rolla building and Norwood Hall being the other two) that are from the school's first 50 years. As of April 2021, Parker Hall holds the Visitor Center, Admissions Office, Registrar, Student Financial Assistance, Accounting and Cashier's Office, and administrative offices.

Jack Carney Puck and Plaza 
The Jack Carney Puck and Plaza is a small, circular stage in the center of the campus. It is used for many student events, and is particularly active during St. Patrick's Day festivities. The Puck is a common gathering area, and tours given to new students often start at the landmark. The stage is recarpeted each year to reflect the next "Best Ever" St. Patrick's Day. Reconstruction of the area around the Puck began in late 2020 to renovate the landmark in honor of former Chancellor John F. "Jack" Carney III. The campus landmark's dedication was celebrated in October 2021.

Schrenk Hall 
Originally known as the New Chemistry Building and built in 1940, Schrenk Hall is home to the Chemistry and Biological Sciences departments.

Solar Village 

Officially opened in December 2010, the Solar Village consists of four entries by Missouri S&T in the U.S. Department of Energy Solar Decathlon.  Students, staff, faculty, and donors of Missouri S&T designed, constructed, and competed homes in each of the first four Decathlons including the Solar House in 2002, the Prairie House in 2005, the Solar House in 2007, and the Show-Me House in 2009.  In 2012, the Solar Village was one of two highlights in a video short that won recognition from Second Nature and a Climate Leadership Award for the campus.  In 2014, the Solar Village was expanded to include a microgrid system and an electric car charging station, and in 2016, Missouri S&T announced a second, EcoVillage, composed of Decathlon entries including the 2013 Chameleon House and the 2015 Nest Home.

Kummer Student Design Center 

The Kummer Design Center was dedicated on May 20, 2011. It was named after Fred and June Kummer who donated $1.25 million of the $2.75 million project, which was funded entirely by private gifts to the university. Fred Kummer is an alumnus of the university. The Kummer Design Center was initially a  building. The building formerly housed the Student Rec Center, and before that it was a Holsum Bread Bakery.

The Kummer Design Center is located at 1051 N Bishop Avenue in Rolla, and is home to the SDELC, short for Student Design and Experiential Learning Center. The SDELC contains offices, a conference room, a machine shop, labs, a computer lab, and an iGEM lab. Twenty of the university's design teams are housed inside of the SDELC. There are approximately twelve hundred students involved on said design teams, and they have 24/7 access to the design center. These students get to use their experiences on the design teams for the university-required experiential learning. The Kummer Design Center is also home to American Pie Company and Spoon Me (frozen yogurt) fast food restaurants.

On April 26, 2019, a Mars Rover designed by S&T's Mars Rover Team broke ground on an expansion for the Kummer Design Center. The expansion added  of new labs, manufacturing, and fabrication bays. In addition it expanded the waterjet, welding, and composites labs. The expansion doubled the size of the previous SDELC. Brinkmann Constructors is the company that built the addition onto the design center. The expansion's highest-level donors were Richard and Nancy Arnold, Brinkmann Constructors, Roger and Karen LaBoude, and Fred and June Kummer. The new expansion was dedicated on September 11, 2020, to a virtual audience.

In the beginning of the COVID-19 pandemic, students and staff used the design center to make PPE for Phelps Health and other surrounding medical facilities. The design center utilized 3D printers to print prototype face shield brackets and face masks.  Some of the prototype files were released for the public to print.

Design teams 
The Advanced Aero-Vehicle Group constructs a remote controlled airplane for the annual Society of Automotive Engineers' Aero Design competition. The project is of interest mainly to aerospace engineering students, but students from other disciplines are also on the team. The Advanced Aero Vehicle Group also constructs a rocket every year. The rocket competes in the USLI competition hosted by NASA, in which the rocket must carry a payload one mile into the atmosphere. The AAVG group is also working on a research and development subgroup to complement the existing plane and rocket groups.
 The Baja SAE design team designs, builds, and races an off-road vehicle each year. The team competes against other universities at international events.
 The BattleBot Design Team is one of the newest design teams, as it began in 2018, in the Student Design Center. The team designed and built its first robot, Ankle Grinder, in 2020 and will compete for the first time on March 20, 2021, at the Norwalk Havoc Competition in Norwalk, Connecticut.
 The Missouri S&T Chem E Car team designs and constructs small chemical-reaction-powered cars that are used in regional competitions. The designed car must be stopped by a timed chemical reactions and the goal of competitions is to see which car can be the most precise and stop at the given distance (15–30 m), solely using chemistry.
 The Missouri S&T Concrete Canoe Team designs and constructs a concrete canoe and races it on a lake in regional and national competitions. The team has participated in concrete canoe competitions since the 1970s. The entire project, including fundraising and construction, is completed by the students. The team took third place in 2004.
 Missouri S&T's chapter of Engineers Without Borders has four ongoing international projects in Guatemala, Ecuador, and Bolivia. Over one hundred students are part of a team that works to develop sustainable solutions to engineering problems, such as lack of access to drinking water, in developing countries.
 Each year the Formula Electric team designs, builds, and races an electric formula-style race car. The team was founded in 2012 and started to compete in 2015. In 2017, the team finished overall 4th, the best they have ever done. For the 2017–2018 season, the team lost its title sponsor.
 The Missouri S&T Formula SAE team constructs a small formula-style race car every year, suitable for mass production and sale to weekend autocrossers. The team competes in Brooklyn, Michigan, against more than 100 other teams from universities around the world. The vehicle's cost, sales presentation, engineering design, acceleration, braking and racing performance all factor into its final score. The team has placed in the top ten in eight of the past twelve competitions, including first-, second- and fourth-place finishes.
 The Missouri S&T Human Powered Vehicle Team demonstrates its members' engineering excellence via a human-powered vehicle. The team promotes alternative energy technology while providing future engineers with hands-on experience in applying classroom knowledge. Through intercollegiate competition, this project hopes to foster leadership, teamwork, and the continuous advancement of technologies for the betterment of humanity. The team competes annually at the American Society of Mechanical Engineers Human Powered Vehicle Challenge in both west and east coast competitions. The team has placed among the top two overall in 14 of 16 competitions, and holds the female sprint record of 41.8 mph and male sprint record of 48.6 mph. In 2010, the team swept both the East and West Coast competitions and placed first in every event: Design, Male Drag Race, Female Drag Race and the Endurance Race, giving the team 1st Place Overall and National Speed Class Champions. In 2015, the team placed second overall in the ASME West Competition and first overall in the ASME East Competition, in the speed class.
 The S&T Mars Rover design team finished in first place at the 2017 international University Rover Challenge competition held June 1–3, 2017, in Hanksville, Utah. Missouri S&T's Mars Rover, named Gryphon, was designed and built by the students. The team developed custom circuitry for the rover, machined the aluminum and carbon-fiber support structure, developed durable wheels for terrain mobility, and 3-D printed gears used in the rover.
 Every year the Miner Aviation team designs, builds, and flies a remote-controlled plane for the American Institute of Aeronautics and Astronautics Design/Build/Fly competition (AIAA DBF). The team was founded in 1999 and first competed in the 2000–2001 competition year. The team was originally named the Advanced Aero Vehicle Group and later changed their name to the Miner Aviation Student Design team during the 2016–2017 competition year. In their first year, they finished 2nd place overall in the Open Class. In the 2002–2003 competition year they finished 1st place overall in the Open Class. They started to compete in the Advanced Class in the 2009–2010 competition year.
 Every two years the Motorcycle Design Team designs, builds, and races a motorbike, competing against universities across the world at the Motorland Aragon racetrack in Alcaniz, Spain.
 Every year the Multirotor Design Team competes in the International Aerial Robotics Competition (IARC). Competitions repeat each year until a team completes the competition. The team designs, builds, and programs drones. The team has also partnered with the Rocket Design team to compete in the Argonia Cup.
 The S&T Robotics Team participates annually in the Intelligent Ground Vehicle Competition (IGVC). The team builds autonomous vehicles that traverse obstacle courses consisting of lane markers and obstacles. The current vehicles are designed to be omnidirectional so that they can easily drive around obstacles. Typically there are 30–50 students on the team and two faculty advisers. The students handle all design and management aspects of the team but occasionally receive help from technicians to fabricate parts.
 The Rocket Design Team competes in the Spaceport America Cup which is designed around the Intercollegiate Rocket Engineering Competition (IREC). The team designs and builds a rocket each year for the competition. The team first started competing in 2015. 2019 was the first year they made two rockets.
 The Missouri S&T Satellite Project (M-SAT) team began as an Aerospace engineering course (AE301 Spacecraft Design) when NASA held a contest for a two-year development and build project (Nanosat program) that had to accomplish its goals in the harsh environment of space. After taking third place in Nanosat-4, the team continued perfecting its twin satellites for spaceflight and entry into the Nanosat-6 competition. During this cycle, the team was awarded "Best Outreach" for its work at encouraging an interest by local school students in STEM-related fields. The team placed second during Nanosat-7, beating rival MIT. With their legacy twin-satellite design and feedback from the AFRL sponsors, the team went on to win Nanosat-8 in 2015.
 Missouri S&T's Solar Car team has met with much success. Every two years, the team constructs a single-passenger car, its top covered with solar cells, that runs exclusively on solar power. The car houses lithium ion batteries, which are much lighter than conventional lead-acid batteries. Every time the car is rebuilt, changes make it lighter and more efficient. The team regularly enters solar car races in the United States and occasionally enters international races. The car claimed first place in Sunrayce '99, first place in the 2000 Formula Sun Grand Prix, fourth place in the Australian World Solar Challenge in 2001, second place in the 2001 American Solar Challenge, and first place in the 2003 American Solar Challenge. In 2016, the team placed fourth in the American Solar Challenge after not participating for six years.
 The Missouri S&T Solar House Team, designs and builds a house that is completely sustained by energy collected directly from the sun. After the house is built on campus, it is disassembled and transported to Washington, D.C. for the Solar Decathlon, a month-long competition. The Solar House Team placed 11th overall in both 2007 and 2009 out of a total of 20 teams. The team is one of only three teams to compete in four decathlons, and one of two teams to compete in four consecutive decathlons. The 2011 Decathlon is the first that Missouri S&T did not participate, but the Solar House Team is back in the 2013 Decathlon in Irvine, California. The team took first place in the Energy Balance category at the 2005 competition. At the 2002 competition the team took first place in Refrigeration, second place in Energy Balance and third in Hot Water. In 2002 and 2005, the Missouri S&T team took 9th place out of 14 teams and 7th place out of 18 teams respectively. After competition, the homes are returned to the Solar Village on the S&T campus where they are rented as student housing.
 The Steel Bridge Design Team has competed since 2002. The AISC Student Steel Bridge Competition Committee releases new rules at the beginning of each school year. Participating teams are required to design and build a 1:10 scale steel bridge every year. Due to COVID-19, the competition was canceled in 2020. The team has advanced to nationals in 2003, 2004, 2008, 2013, 2014, 2016, 2018, and 2019. Its best finish thus far was 12th in 2004.
 The Underwater Robotics Team designs, builds, programs, and tests robots that are meant to operate underwater. They compete in the Marine Advanced Technology Education remotely operated vehicles (MATE ROV) competition.

Former buildings 

 The Jackling Gymnasium opened in 1915 and was named after Daniel C. Jackling, a successful alumnus who previously gave $1500 to improve the athletic field that was also later named after him. The Jackling Gym was a two-story building; the first floor had a  swimming pool and lockers, while the second floor had a  gymnasium. A gallery above the gym had seats to watch basketball games and a running track. After the end of World War II, the gym also housed about two dozen student-athletes in rooms around the pool and basketball court. These students became known as the "Jackling Jocks" and were housed in the building over a period of 15 years. In August 1965, the gymnasium was to be destroyed due to safety concerns. The Jackling Gymnasium was the first building on campus to be demolished. The Curtis Laws Wilson Library was built on the Jackling Gymnasium's former site. The Gale Bulman Building was built in 1969 as a replacement for the Jackling Gymnasium.
Built in 1885, the Old Chemistry Building was the second building on campus after the Rolla Building. The Old Chemistry Building burned to the ground in 1969.

Off-campus

Electromagnetic Compatibility Laboratory 
The Electromagnetic Compatibility (EMC) Laboratory supports related research. The Missouri University of Science and Technology Electromagnetic Compatibility Consortium is a broad partnership of digital electronics companies committed to funding electromagnetic compatibility research through this facility.

Experimental mine 
This limestone mine is located near the main campus and is used for the teaching and research activities of the Department of Mining Engineering.  The facilities, which cover , include the mine and adjacent surface dolomite quarries. The mine supports student competition teams, such as the mine rescue team, and the annual "Haunted Mine" Halloween event.  The mine has been used by the school since 1921.

Academics

Rankings
Recent school rankings include:

 Missouri S&T was ranked No. 5 in the country for "best colleges for engineering majors" by Money. (2022)
 Missouri S&T was ranked No. 4 among public universities for "return on investment, career opportunities, and internship opportunities for students" by The Princeton Review. (2021)
 Missouri S&T was ranked No. 1 for Missouri's best value college by SmartAsset "with an average starting salary for new graduates of $67,300. Tuition at the University is $9,246 and students receive an average of $8,274 in scholarships and grants." (2020)
 Missouri S&T was ranked No. 42 in the United States for "40-year return on investment, or net present value (NPV) with an average return of $1,548,000 for a bachelor's degree recipient" by the Center on Education and the Workforce. (2019)
 Missouri S&T was ranked No. 25 in the "top 25 STEM-centric schools" by Forbes. (2018)
 Missouri S&T was ranked No. 3 in the "top 10 places to get an engineering degree in the U.S." by USA Today. (2016)
 Business Insider ranked Missouri S&T No. 5 among the "most underrated colleges in America". (2015)

Organization
The university is divided into three colleges, each of which contains multiple departments.

The College of Arts, Sciences, and Education (CASE) has 11 departments:

The College of Computing and Engineering (CEC) has 9 departments:

The Kummer College of Innovation, Entrepreneurship and Economic Development (Kummer College) has 3 departments:

Student engineering projects
The Student Design & Experiential Learning Center (SDELC) was established in 2000 to better support the various multi-disciplinary student design teams. In 2004, the center's mission expanded to provide experiential learning in academic courses, identify and support student service learning projects within the curriculum, and support ad hoc student teams in specialty academic events involving multi-disciplinary student research.

By 2006, the SDELC had expanded to ten student design teams. The center's expanded mission involved better funding and offering support and resources to multi-disciplinary project teams that had a research base to their activities. The SDELC provided academic credit opportunities in the form of three, one-hour classes on design, leadership and communication. The center also offers a half-credit course on experiential design through the Residential College (RC) program which has a per-semester enrollment of over 100 students engaged in hands-on learning projects. The SDELC's student design teams, research teams and projects, and academic courses are the foundation of experiential learning at Missouri S&T.

Athletics

The Missouri S&T athletic teams are named the Miners and Lady Miners. The university is a member of the Division II level of the National Collegiate Athletic Association (NCAA), primarily competing in the Great Lakes Valley Conference (GLVC) for most of its sports since the 2005–06 academic year; while its men's swimming team competes in the New South Intercollegiate Swim Conference (NSISC). The Miners and Lady Miners previously competed in the Mid-America Intercollegiate Athletics Association (MIAA) from 1935–36 to 2004–05; and in the Missouri College Athletic Union (MCAU) of the National Association of Intercollegiate Athletics (NAIA) from 1924–25 to 1932–33.

Missouri S&T competes in 17 intercollegiate varsity sports (10 for men, 7 for women): Men's sports include baseball, basketball, cross country, football, golf, soccer, swimming, track & field (indoor and outdoor) and volleyball; while women's sports include basketball, cross country, soccer, softball, track & field (indoor and outdoor), volleyball and spirit squad. Former sports included women's golf. As of July 2022, men's volleyball became the 17th varsity sport in the 2023 spring season (2022–23 school year).

Notes

History
The name comes from the university's history as a mining school. Intercollegiate competition began with a baseball game in 1892 with the first football game in the following year.

Club and intramural sports
Club sports associated with Missouri S&T include ultimate frisbee, lacrosse, rugby union, roller hockey, trap and skeet, tennis, baseball, and water polo.

Intramural sports have a very large following at the Missouri S&T. With over 60 men's teams and over 10 women's teams, sports are arranged into divisions. Thirty different sports are contested each year: golf, softball, swimming, ultimate, flag football, billiards, badminton, volleyball, racquetball, bowling, basketball, table tennis, tennis, track, weightlifting, and soccer.

Student life
The Missouri S&T event calendar includes current campus events.

There are over 200 student organizations at Missouri S&T, including student government, professional societies, community service organizations, and religious and cultural groups.

Student media
The student-run newspaper at Missouri S&T, The Missouri Miner, is published every Thursday during the school year and can be read online, with ongoing digitization of each issue since the first in 1915. In February 2007, the paper threatened to sue the school because the university cut funding. After a one-school-year break for many reasons including a funding cut, The Missouri Miner continued publication in the fall semester of 2009.

Production of the university's RollaMo yearbook is handled by undergraduate students. Amateur radio station, WØEEE, founded in 1931 and run by the Amateur Radio Club, was the first campus club at MSM and is one of the oldest student/college amateur stations in the US. The club is located in Emerson Electrical Company Hall.

Two broadcast radio stations are associated with Missouri S&T: KMNR, previously known as KMSM, is a student-run, freeform radio station whose music playlist varies with the mood and inclination of the DJ, with some playing caller requests. Every year KMNR hosts two concerts – Freakers Ball in the fall and MasqueRave (formerly Glitter Ball) in the spring. KMST, previously known as KUMR, is a member-supported public radio station, typically playing classical, bluegrass and jazz and National Public Radio programs. On July 16, 2007, KUMR officially changed its call letters to KMST, in advance of the change of name from "University of Missouri–Rolla" to the "Missouri University of Science and Technology". In 2017, KMST's broadcast operations were transferred to the University of Missouri–St. Louis.

Honor societies 

Honor societies with chapters at Missouri S&T include:

Greek life
Approximately 22% of the undergraduate student body belongs to a social Greek organization.
There are 19 fraternities and 5 sororities, which collectively raise over $125,000 annually toward various philanthropies.

The Beta-Eta chapter of Tau Kappa Epsilon was founded at the Missouri School of Mines and Metallurgy on March 8, 1947 – the fraternity's 55th chapter. It remains active at Missouri S&T and has a chartered alumni association. As of fall 2022, the chapter had initiated 1,259 members and received 69 international awards. The Beta-Eta chapter has been recognized internationally nine times as a "Top TKE Chapter", the fraternity's highest recognition for a chapter, most recently for the 2021–2022 academic year. In 2017, the Tau Kappa Epsilon chapter at Missouri S&T completed construction of a new chapter house on Fraternity Row where the old Delta Sigma Phi round house was located. The former TKE house was demolished in 2020 after asbestos abatement in 2019.

University housing
Various residence halls are available for those who choose to live on campus:
 Miner Village – five buildings of two- and four-bedroom apartments, with a central clubhouse
 Residential Commons – two- or four-bedroom suites for four people
 Rolla Suites – two buildings of studio and efficiency style rooms
 Thomas Jefferson Residence Hall – two towers of two-bed rooms, with an in-hall dining facility
 University Commons – newest complex, with four-bedroom apartments for four or eight people

The Christian Campus Fellowship also provides university-approved housing just off campus for 64 residents.

Most of the former Quadrangle residence hall buildings were razed and replaced with a parking lot in the late 2010s.

Traditions

St. Patrick's Day is the largest annual celebration and predominant cultural event at Missouri S&T, with each year's observance touted as the "Best Ever!". During St. Pat's, students wear green sweatshirts (which are sold as fund-raisers throughout the season), carry shillelaghs and party (including drinking green beer). One tradition, observed primarily among fraternities, is the "killing" of rubber snakes in commemoration of St. Patrick's mythical banishing of snakes from Ireland.

Along with the snake invasion comes the tradition of Follies. Students meet daily at "the Puck" (a short cylindrical stage bearing a large shamrock) to hear jokes and participate in short competitions. On the third day of Follies, students move to the town's band-shell to participate in the ceremonial arrival of St. Pat's Court. The day after Follies, students participate in "Gonzo and Games". Gonzo and Games are two days of elaborate games in which different organizations compete. Friday of St. Pat's week is concluded with Coronation, a ceremony where the Queen of Love and Beauty is announced. The final event of St. Pat's week is a Saturday morning parade on Pine Street, which is painted green by St. Pat's Board Alumni. This parade is known throughout the United States and boasts well over one hundred floats and participating groups.

The rationale for the celebration is the notion that St. Patrick is the patron saint of engineers.
Such recognition of St. Patrick began in 1903 when the engineering students of the University of Missouri in Columbia claimed St. Patrick's Day to be a holiday for engineers. The tradition continues and has been adopted by many other schools across the nation. A bronze statue of St. Patrick, by St. Louis sculptor Rudolph Edward Torrini, is located on the Wilson Library Plaza. St. Patrick's Day 2008 marked the one hundredth consecutive year of the holiday's celebration at Missouri S&T. The university cancelled all school-sanctioned St. Patrick's Day celebrations for the first time in 2020 due to the COVID-19 pandemic. 2021 included "part virtual and part socially distanced" events for the holiday.

Notable faculty

Notable alumni

References

External links
 
 
 Official athletics website

 
1870 establishments in Missouri
Buildings and structures in Phelps County, Missouri
Educational institutions established in 1870
Education in Phelps County, Missouri
Engineering universities and colleges in Missouri
Public universities and colleges in Missouri
UMR
Missouri-Rolla, University of
Technological universities in the United States